The beady pipefish (Hippichthys penicillus) is a species of pipefish of the family Syngnathidae. It is found in the Indo-West Pacific, from the western Persian Gulf, to the north central Indian Ocean, to Japan and Australia. It is expected to feed on small crustaceans, similar to other pipefish. This species is ovoviviparous, with males carrying eggs in a brood pouch before giving birth to live young. Average brood size is 177.

Identification

H. penicuillus is usually tan, greenish, or brown, with narrow pale bars across the back and dark edged white spots on the sides. The sides of tail rings usually have a pale blotch on or above the inferior ridge.

References

Further reading
Encyclopedia of Life
IUCN Seahorse, Pipefish & Stickleback Specialist Group

Fish described in 1849
penicillus
Freshwater fish